Don Charles Selwyn  (22 November 1935 – 13 April 2007) was a Māori actor and filmmaker from New Zealand. He was a founding member of the New Zealand Māori Theatre Trust and directed the 2002 film Te tangata whai rawa o Weneti (The Maori merchant of Venice), the first Māori language feature film with English subtitles.

Life 
Born of Ngāti Kurī and Te Aupōuri descent, Selwyn grew up in Taumarunui and began his professional life as a teacher. 

In 1967 Selwyn acted in The Golden Lover at Downstage Theatre directed by Richard Campion alongside Wi Kuki Kaa and Bob Hirini. Also on stage produced by Downstage Theatre and directed by Campion and designed by Raymond Boyce, Selwyn was in Othello with a cast of 17 including Peter Vere-Jones and Elric Hooper in 1976. It was so popular it transferred to the Opera House. He appeared in an episode of Ngaio Marsh Theatre in 1977. In 1984 he began a film and television training course for Māori and Pacific Islanders He Taonga i Tawhiti (Gifts from Afar). In 1992 Ruth Kaupua Panapa and Selwyn co-founded He Taonga Films. 

Te tangata whai rawa o Weneti (The Maori merchant of Venice) (2002) directed by Selwyn was the first Māori language feature film, it was produced by He Taonga Films. He had previously staged it as a play in 1990 at the Koanga Festival. It had been translated from Shakespeare's Merchant of Venice by Pei Te Hurinui Jones in 1945. The film was produced to upskill Māori in the film industry.  

In 2003 at the New Zealand Film Awards Selwyn was presented with a lifetime achievement award. In 2007 the Arts Foundation of New Zealand selected him for an Icon Award, which was awarded to him privately shortly before he died.

In the 1999 New Year Honours, Selwyn was appointed an Officer of the New Zealand Order of Merit, for services to theatre, film and television.

Selected filmography
 Rangi's Catch (1973) as Mr. Rukuhia
 Sleeping Dogs (1977) as Taupiri
 Came a Hot Friday (1985) as Norm
 My Letter to George (1986) as Joseph
 The Last Tattoo (1994) as Bill Davin
 Te tangata whai rawa o Weneti (The Maori merchant of Venice) (2002) - director

References

External links
 

1935 births
2007 deaths
New Zealand male Māori actors
New Zealand film directors
New Zealand male film actors
Indigenous filmmakers in New Zealand
Te Aupōuri people
Ngāti Kurī people
Officers of the New Zealand Order of Merit
People from Taumarunui
Māori-language film directors